The League of Christian Employers (Dutch: Verbond van Kristelijke Werkgevers, VKW) is a Flemish Christian employers organization. Herman Van de Velde is the president of the organization.

Notable members
 François-Xavier van der Straten-Waillet (director of VKW)
 Léon Bekaert (1891-1961), Bekaert
 Jan Callewaert (CEO Option)
 Jef Colruyt (Colruyt N.V.)

See also
 Agoria
 European Association of Craft, Small and Medium-Sized Enterprises (UEAPME)
 Federation of Belgian Enterprises
 UNIAPAC
 UNIZO
 VOKA
 Walloon Union of Companies

References
 
 VKW en Unizo houden vinger aan de pols van ondernemend Limburg
 Nieuwe directeur bij christelijke werkgevers VKW
 Etion Forum for committed business in ODIS - Online Database for Intermediary Structures 
 Archives of Etion Forum for committed business in ODIS - Online Database for Intermediary Structures 

VKW
VKW